The B.A. Eagle was a light aircraft manufactured in the United Kingdom during the 1930s. It was a three-seat low-wing monoplane built by the "British Klemm Aeroplane Company" (which later became known as the British Aircraft Manufacturing Co.) Production was limited, with 43 aircraft built.

Design and development
The British Klemm Aeroplane Company developed the B.K.1 Eagle, a three-seat light aircraft as a follow-up to the British Klemm Swallow, its licensed copy of the Klemm L.25.  While similar to the Klemm Kl 32, it was an entirely independent design by G. Handasyde, the chief designer of British Klemm, first flying in early 1934. The Eagle was a low-wing wooden monoplane with a retractable undercarriage. It had an enclosed cabin for the pilot and two passengers. Six of this initial version of the Eagle were built.

As was the case with the Swallow, a revised version was introduced in 1935 when British Klemm was renamed the British Aircraft Manufacturing Co. This version, the B.A. Eagle II had a revised rudder and a deepened rear fuselage. A total of 37 Eagle IIs were built, including a single example fitted with a fixed undercarriage.

Operational history
Eagles were mainly sold to private owners, with a few also being used by flying clubs or as executive transports.  In India, the Nawab of Sachin operated an Eagle as his personal aircraft. Eagles were also used for air racing, with several being entered into the King's Cup Races between 1935 and 1937. Single examples were also entered into the MacRobertson Air Race of 1934 between Britain and Australia and the 1936 Schlesinger Race between England and South Africa. Neither aircraft completed the races.

At the outbreak of the Second World War, seven Eagles were pressed into RAF service in the UK, with two in Australia and one in Kenya, but the undercarriages proved vulnerable in RAF service, with most airframes being written off due to undercarriage failure. Two aircraft survived the war to be flown by civil owners in Australia.

Variants
B.K. Eagle
Initial production version, six built.
B.A. Eagle 2
Revised production version with modified structure, 37 built.

Operators

Royal Air Force operated seven aircraft.

Spanish Republican Air Force from LAPE

Survivors

Two Eagles currently survive.
G-AFAX
Exhibited at the Fundaćion Infante de Orleans air museum at Madrid, Spain. Still active 2009.
VH-UTI
Exhibited in Australia and still active in 2012.

Specifications (B.K. Eagle 2)

References

External links

 Airliners.net – Photos

1930s British civil utility aircraft
Eagle
Low-wing aircraft
Single-engined tractor aircraft
Aircraft first flown in 1934